Steve Reinsfield (born 19 April 1963) is a New Zealand wrestler. He competed in the men's freestyle 62 kg at the 1988 Summer Olympics.

References

1963 births
Living people
New Zealand male sport wrestlers
Olympic wrestlers of New Zealand
Wrestlers at the 1988 Summer Olympics
Sportspeople from Auckland
Commonwealth Games silver medallists for New Zealand
Commonwealth Games medallists in wrestling
Wrestlers at the 1982 Commonwealth Games
Wrestlers at the 1986 Commonwealth Games
Medallists at the 1982 Commonwealth Games
Medallists at the 1986 Commonwealth Games